Guilfoil is a surname. Notable people with the surname include:

Dwight D. Guilfoil Jr. (1922–1989), American businessman 
 Kelly (nee Guilfoil) Craft (born 1962), United States Ambassador to the United Nations and United States Ambassador to Canada
O. D. Guilfoil (1863–1955), American politician

See also
Guilfoile

Surnames of Irish origin